The Devils is a name for:

 The Devils (play), the 1960 play by John Whiting based on the book The Devils of Loudon (1952) by Aldous Huxley
 The Devils (film), the 1971 Ken Russell film
 The Devils (band), a 2000s pop music project of Nick Rhodes and Stephen Duffy
 The New Jersey Devils, a National Hockey League team
 The Devils (2002 film), a 2002 French drama film

The Devils is also an alternate name or translation for:
 Demons (Dostoevsky novel) or The Possessed, an 1872 novel by Russian writer Fyodor Dostoevsky
 Les Diaboliques (film), a 1955 film by Henri-Georges Clouzot

See also
 Devils